The Juno Awards of 2020, the 49th Juno Awards, was an awards presentation that was to be held at SaskTel Centre in Saskatoon, Saskatchewan on 15 March 2020. The awards and associated events were cancelled due to the emergence of the COVID-19 pandemic in Canada, making it the first Juno Awards since 1988 to be cancelled. The award winners were announced on 29 June 2020 in an online event.

Host city bids
Saskatoon attempted to host the 2019 awards, but abandoned that bid due to lack of funding. The city's subsequent bid for 2020 was successful. The municipal government of Saskatoon had allocated $350,000 towards the event.

Hamilton, Ontario was previously interested in bidding for the 2019 or 2020 Junos.

Impact of the COVID-19 pandemic and cancellation

On 12 March 2020, three days before the presentation, the Canadian Academy of Recording Arts and Sciences (CARAS) announced that the ceremony and all ancillary events had been cancelled due to health concerns surrounding the coronavirus, as it had been declared a pandemic by World Health Organization the day before. Although Saskatchewan had, until shortly after the cancellation (when its chief medical officer announced the first presumptive case in the province), not had any confirmed cases of coronavirus yet, an announcement on Wednesday that the show would go on had faced backlash from residents and others. CARAS stated that it would "coordinate an alternate plan" to honour its 2020 award recipients.

The Junos Songwriters' Circle, an annual event normally held as part of the Juno Awards weekend which features Canadian songwriters performing and sharing the stories behind their songs in a panel format, was relaunched in May 2020 in a web series format, with the first episode featuring Brett Kissel, Dominique Fils-Aimé, Kaia Kater and Devon Portielje. The second episode featured Rose Cousins, William Prince, Ed Robertson and Tenille Townes; the third featured Dallas Green, Sarah Harmer, Joel Plaskett and Buffy Sainte-Marie; and the fourth featured Scott Helman, Meghan Patrick, Tom Wilson and Whitehorse.

Online ceremonies 
On 18 June, the Junos announced that a virtual ceremony would be broadcast through CBC Gem on 29 June 2020.

Events
Alessia Cara was the planned host of the main ceremonies. The livestream was hosted by Odario Williams and Damhnait Doyle.

Performers
The following performers appeared during the livestream:
 iskwē
 Neon Dreams
 Alessia Cara
 The Dead South

Nominees and winners
Jann Arden was set to be inducted into the Canadian Music Hall of Fame during the main ceremonies. As the ceremony was cancelled, her formal induction instead took place at the Juno Awards of 2021.

Nominations were announced on 18 January 2020. Winners were announced on 29 June.

People

Albums

Songs and recordings

Other

References

2020 in Canadian music
2020 music awards
Culture of Saskatoon
2020
Music events postponed due to the COVID-19 pandemic
Music festivals in Saskatchewan
2020 awards in Canada
June 2020 events in Canada